Gethsemane is a garden at the foot of the Mount of Olives in Jerusalem where, according to the four Gospels of the New Testament, Jesus underwent the agony in the garden and was arrested before his crucifixion. It is a place of great resonance in Christianity. There are several small olive groves in church property, all adjacent to each other and identified with biblical Gethsemane.

Etymology 
The name is derived from the Aramaic  (Gaḏ-Šmānê), meaning "oil press".  and  call it  (chōríon), meaning a place or estate. The Gospel of John says Jesus entered a garden ( kêpos) with his disciples.

Location

According to the New Testament it was a place that Jesus and his disciples customarily visited, which allowed Judas Iscariot to find him on the night Jesus was arrested.

There are four locations, all of them at or near the western foot of the Mount of Olives, officially claimed by different denominations to be the place where Jesus prayed on the night he was betrayed.
The garden at the Catholic Church of All Nations, built over the "Rock of the Agony".
The location near the Tomb of the Virgin Mary to the north.
The Greek Orthodox location to the east.
The Russian Orthodox orchard, next to the Church of Mary Magdalene.

William McClure Thomson, author of The Land and the Book, first published in 1880, wrote: "When I first came to Jerusalem, and for many years afterward, this plot of ground was open to all whenever they chose to come and meditate beneath its very old olive trees. The Latins, however, have within the last few years succeeded in gaining sole possession, and have built a high wall around it. The Greeks have invented another site a little to the north of it. My own impression is that both are wrong. The position is too near the city, and so close to what must have always been the great thoroughfare eastward, that our Lord would scarcely have selected it for retirement on that dangerous and dismal night. I am inclined to place the garden in the secluded vale several hundred yards to the north-east of the present Gethsemane."

All of the foregoing is based on long-held tradition and the conflating of the synoptic accounts of Mark (14:31) and Matthew (26:36) with the Johannine account (John 18:1). Mark and Matthew record that Jesus went to "a place called the oil press (Gethsemane)" and John states he went to a garden near the Kidron Valley. Modern scholarship acknowledges that the exact location of Gethsemane is unknown.

Pilgrimage site

Scriptural basis
According to Luke , Jesus' anguish on the Mount of Olives (Luke does not mention Gethsemane; Luke 22:39–40) was so deep that "his sweat was as it were great drops of blood falling down to the ground."

Near the tomb of Mary

According to the Eastern Orthodox Church tradition, Gethsemane is the garden where the Virgin Mary was buried and was assumed into heaven after her dormition on Mount Zion.

History
The Garden of Gethsemane became a focal site for early Christian pilgrims. It was visited in 333 by the anonymous "Pilgrim of Bordeaux", whose Itinerarium Burdigalense is the earliest description left by a Christian traveler in the Holy Land. In his Onomasticon, Eusebius of Caesarea notes the site of Gethsemane located "at the foot of the Mount of Olives", and he adds that "the faithful were accustomed to go there to pray".

Eight ancient olive trees growing in the Latin site of the garden may be 900 years old (see ).

In 1681 Croatian knights of the Holy Order of Jerusalem, Paul, Antun and James bought the Gethsemane Garden and donated it to the Franciscan community, which owns it to this day. A three-dimensional plate on the right side next to the entrance to the garden describes the aforementioned gift to the community.

Age of the olive trees
A study conducted by the Italian National Research Council (CNR) in 2012 found that three of the olive trees in the garden are amongst the oldest known to science. Dates of AD 1092, 1166 and 1198 were obtained by carbon dating from older parts of the trunks of three trees. DNA tests show that the trees were originally planted from the same parent plant. This could indicate an attempt to keep the lineage of an older individual intact. Possibly, the three trees tested could have been sprouts reviving from the older roots. According to the researchers, "The results of tests on trees in the Garden of Gethsemane have not settled the question of whether the gnarled trees are the very same which sheltered Jesus because olive trees can grow back from roots after being cut down".

However, Mauro Bernabei, author of the paper published as a result of the CNR study, writes: "All the tree trunks are hollow inside so that the central, older wood is missing... In the end, only three from a total of eight olive trees could be successfully dated. The dated ancient olive trees do, however, not allow any hypothesis to be made with regard to the age of the remaining five giant olives [sic]."

Archaeology 
In 2014, an archaeological survey of the site was conducted by Amit Re'em and David Yeger on behalf of the Israel Antiquities Authority (IAA).

In December 2020, archaeologists revealed the remains of 1,500 year-old Byzantine church (known as the Church of All Nations) and the foundations of a Second Temple-era ritual bath (also known as a mikveh). According to Dr. Leah and Dr. Rosario, Greek inscriptions were written on the church's floor as: "for the memory and repose of the lovers of Christ… accept the offering of your servants and give them remission of sins".

According to Israel Antiquities Authority's Jerusalem district head Amit Re'em, the uniqueness of the bath is that it is the first archaeological evidence at the site of Gethsemane where Christians have made pilgrimages for centuries, in the days of Jesus.

See also 

 Abbey of Our Lady of Gethsemani
 Agony in the Garden
 Holy Hour

References 

Works cited

External links 
 Catholic Encyclopedia on Gethsemane
 Paul’s Knowledge of the Garden of Gethsemane Narrative , by Christopher Price
 FotoTagger Annotated Galleries – Gethsemane in the art and reality
 Article on the history of the Russian monastery itself
Photos of the Garden of Gethsemane at the Manar al-Athar photo archive

 
Christianity in Jerusalem
Geography of Jerusalem
New Testament places
Mount of Olives
New Testament Aramaic words and phrases
Gardens in Israel
Gospel of Matthew
Gospel of Mark